Skagway Airport  is a state-owned public-use airport in the city of Skagway, Alaska.

This airport is included in the National Plan of Integrated Airport Systems for 2015–2019, which categorized it as a nonprimary commercial service airport based on 7,532 enplanements in 2012. As per Federal Aviation Administration records, the airport had 10,727 passenger boardings (enplanements) in calendar year 2008, 6,468 enplanements in 2009, and 8,531 in 2010.

Facilities and aircraft 

Skagway Airport has one runway designated 2/20 with an asphalt surface measuring 3,550 by 75 feet (1,082 x 23 m). For the 12-month period ending December 31, 2006, the airport had 12,500 aircraft operations, an average of 34 per day: 86% air taxi and 14% general aviation.

The airport does not have a tower, but does have a small passenger building at the south end. Skagway is known as a very windy place. In the summer the wind generally blows from the south and can be quite strong and gusty. In the winter the wind turns around and blows from the north. The airport is situated in a north–south direction and against the west side of the valley next to the Skagway River. There have been a number of fatal accidents over the past decades, generally by privately owned aircraft owners who did not understand the tight constraints of the path of landings and takeoffs. It is wise to talk to an experienced pilot from one of the airlines to understand the issues.

There have been landings at this airport by small jet aircraft, but rarely. At the south end, in the summer, there is a commercial helicopter tourist company that flies multiple craft throughout the day.
Rarely, seaplanes have landed in the ocean and taxied to the small boat harbor, but a new wave-wall that was constructed a few years ago makes that option more difficult. Also, the wind can make the ocean very choppy at times.

Airlines and destinations 
The following airlines offer scheduled passenger service at this airport:

Statistics

Airline market share

Top destinations

See also 
 Skagway Seaplane Base
 List of airports in Alaska

References

External links 

 Alaska FAA airport diagram 
 Topographic map from USGS The National Map

Airports in Alaska
Transportation in Municipality of Skagway Borough, Alaska
Buildings and structures in the Municipality of Skagway Borough, Alaska